Mark Rein-Hagen, stylized as Mark Rein•Hagen (born 1964), is an American role-playing, card, video and board game designer  best known as the creator of Vampire: The Masquerade and its associated World of Darkness games.  Along with Jonathan Tweet, he is also one of the original two designers of Ars Magica.

Career

Late 1980s: Lion Rampant and Ars Magica
In 1987, Rein-Hagen and Jonathan Tweet founded game publisher Lion Rampant while students at Saint Olaf College; there they met Lisa Stevens who later joined the company. Rein-Hagen and Tweet designed Ars Magica over a period of nine months, publishing it in 1987. Lion Rampant encountered financial difficulties in 1990, but after Stevens pitched the idea of a merger to Rein-Hagen and Stewart Wieck, they decided to merge White Wolf and Lion Rampant forming a new company White Wolf Game Studio, with the two as co-owners. Of his experience at Lion Rampant, Rein-Hagen recalls

1990s: Vampire: The Masquerade and The World of Darkness

While Rein-Hagen was on the road with Wieck and Stevens to GenCon 23 in 1990, he conceived of the game Vampire: The Masquerade which became his main project for the next year, and was published by the new company in 1991. Next year (1992) Rein-Hagen wrote (with Robert Hatch and Bill Bridges) Werewolf: The Apocalypse which was published through White Wolf.
Mage (1993) was based to a certain extent on a game that Rein-Hagen had imagined back in 1989 as something like a modern-day Ars Magica, although this was the first World of Darkness game in which he was not explicitly involved.
Wraith (1994) marked his return to the design of the core games in the World of Darkness setting. Rein-Hagen was developing a science-fiction game called Exile to be published in 1997, which was to be owned by a non-profit called the Null Foundation. However, White Wolf encountered financial difficulties in 1995–1996, which caused a falling out between Rein-Hagen and Wieck and his brother Steve Wieck. As a result, Rein-Hagen left White Wolf taking Exile with him. His Null Foundation put out a playtest draft of Exile in 1997, but the game was never fully published.

He served as a writer and producer for Kindred: The Embraced, a 1996 TV show loosely based on Vampire, produced by Aaron Spelling and shown on Fox TV. He was unhappy with the finished product because FOX's producers had a vision for the series he did not share. “The show wasn’t as good as it could have been, if they only had listened to me more.” Kindred was cancelled after eight episodes, however, following the death of its star Mark Frankel any attempts to revive it were abandoned. Rein-Hagen continued to work in Hollywood for four years total, but disillusioned and fed up trying to make it as a writer, he decided to leave it behind. “It was the goal of my life, but finally I just left”.

2000s
He founded the company Atomaton, Inc. a few years later, which produced his game Z-G in 2001; Atomaton ceased operation in 2003.

Rein-Hagen published Whimsy Cards, Ars Magica, and major Ars Magica supplements through Lion Rampant with Jonathan Tweet. Tweet and Rein-Hagen worked with Stevens, John Nephew, and others who would become hobby game professionals.

Rein-Hagen, along with Ray Winninger and Stewart Wieck, made major contributions to D.O.A., designed by Greg Gorden of Mayfair Games in conjunction with White Wolf, but the game was never published. It was based on a concept called "Inferno" that Rein-Hagen had worked on previously for many years at Lion Rampant, wherein players took on the roles of dead characters from old campaigns.

Rein-Hagen sold his shares in White Wolf in 2007 and left the gaming field. As of mid-2008 he was living in Tbilisi, Georgia, with his wife and child during the Russo-Georgian War (2008 South Ossetia War). Rein-Hagen was evacuated with other US citizens living in Georgia and founded the site sosgeorgia.org (now defunct) to help the international media track what was happening there.

2010s
In 2012 Rein-Hagen worked on a card game called Democracy for his company Make Believe Games. This game was successfully funded by Kickstarter in November 2012. As of December 3, 2014, over two years after funding, fulfillment is largely complete. On February 4, 2014 Rein-Hagen released a statement citing poor health as the reason for his lack of communication and promising that backers would get their game. Commentators were extremely unhappy with the tone of the message and complained that Rein-Hagen's ill health had not affected his ability to work on other crowd-funded projects.  The game Democracy shipped on November 18, 2014.

In a YouTube interview, Rein-Hagen spoke fondly of his former work on role-playing games and how he is working on a new role-playing game. Rein-Hagen elaborated on this role-playing game in March 2013, in another YouTube interview, describing some of the mechanics and speculating on a release date without naming it. In addition he discussed his new game Succubus: The Reborn.  Succubus: The Reborn had a kickstarter through Make-Believe Games that started on March 18, 2013 and failed to be funded on April 19, 2013.

The result of a June 2013 Kickstarter campaign, a horror RPG entitled I Am Zombie was released in 2015.

Bibliography

Lion Rampant
Author

Ars Magica First Edition (1987)
Whimsy Cards (1987)  
The Bats of Mercille (Only available at 1988 and 1989 Gencon) 
Saga Pack (1988)
The Stormrider (1989)
Covenants (1989-1990)
The Broken Covenant of Calebais (2004)

White Wolf
Author
 Vampire: The Masquerade Rulebook (1991)
 Vampire: The Masquerade's Book of the Damned
 Werewolf: The Apocalypse's Werewolf: The Apocalypse Second Edition
 Wraith: The Oblivion's The Face of Death
 Book of the Kindred (1996)
 Chicago Chronicles Volume 1
 Vampire: The Dark Ages Rulebook (1996)

Additional Design
 Vampire: The Dark Ages Rulebook (1996)

Additional Material
 The Book of Shadows: The Mage Players Guide (1994)

Design
 Vampire: The Masquerade Rulebook (1991)
 Book of the Kindred (1996)
 The Dark Ages Rulebook (1996)

Developer
 Vampire: The Masquerade Rulebook (1991)
 Vampire: The Masquerade's Book of the Damned
 Werewolf: The Apocalypse's Rite of Passage
 Chicago Chronicles Volume 1 (1996)
 Chicago Chronicles Volume 3 (1996)

Original Concept and Design
 Mage: The Ascension Second Edition (1995)
 Chicago Chronicles Volume 1 (1996)

References

Living people
Live-action role-playing game designers
Role-playing game designers
White Wolf game designers
St. Olaf College alumni
1964 births